School District 109 may refer to:

Indian Springs School District 109
Deerfield Public School District 109